Mount Cotton Road, or Mt Cotton Rd, is a major split road in the Brisbane area of South East Queensland, Australia. It runs in both an east-west direction between Burbank (Brisbane) and Sheldon (Redlands), and a north-south direction between Capalaba (Redlands) and Carbrook (Logan).

The road is notable for connecting three adjacent local government areas of Queensland: the City of Brisbane, Redland City, and the City of Logan. As there are no highways in this region east of the Gateway and Pacific Motorways, Mount Cotton Road often provides the fastest link between the three cities (more so regarding the south-east of Brisbane and north-east of Logan).

History
The branching segments of Mount Cotton Road were originally known by multiple different names. The Burbank segment, west of the aforementioned roundabout, was once known as Broadwater Road, while the resulting northern branch was known as Capalaba School Road.

Initially, Mount Cotton Road would have referred to the path travelled by the earliest colonial settlers of Mount Cotton in the mid-1800s. As the surrounding region grew and became better-connected, the name spread to some adjoining roads, causing the multi-branched structure of Mount Cotton Rd today.

Much of the road was once surrounded by farmland. This was gradually replaced with residential properties, prompting the roadside construction of: the Carbrook Lutheran Cemetery and Church in the 1870s; Capalaba State School in 1880; telephone lines, a community hall, and an avicultural farm in 1935-36; a store and post office in 1948; a Salvation Army hall in 1960; and Capalaba Park Shopping Centre in 1981.

With the construction of the Leslie Harrison Dam in the 1960s, the portions of the road near Tingalpa Creek were upgraded.

Sections of Mt Cotton Rd have since been identified as dangerous driving areas, due to high incidences of crashes with other cars and wallabies, leading to investigations in recent years.

Mt Cotton Road has been identified as a terminus point for the Coomera Connector, a highway project designed to parallel the M1.

Landmarks

Significant remaining structures and natural landmarks located along Mount Cotton Road include:

 Hindu Mandir Association of Queensland, Burbank
 Tingalpa Creek, Burbank/Capalaba/Sheldon
 Redlands PCYC, Capalaba
 Capalaba State College, Capalaba
 Capalaba Park Shopping Centre, Capalaba
 Sirromet Winery, Mount Cotton
 Mount Cotton State School, Mount Cotton
 Mount Cotton Quarry, Mount Cotton
 The RACQ Mobility Centre (driver training), Cornubia
 Great Southern Memorial Park Cemetery and Crematorium, Carbrook
 Carbrook Lutheran Cemetery, Carbrook

Major intersections
The east-west section has no major intersections.  The north-south section is shown below.

See also
 Mount Cotton, Queensland
 Old Cleveland Road
 Logan Road
 Road transport in Brisbane

References

Roads in Brisbane
Roads in Redland City
Capalaba, Queensland